Helene-Lange-Schule may refer to:
Helene-Lange-Schule (Frankfurt), a modern language gymnasium school in Frankfurt am Main, Germany
Helene-Lange-School (Wiesbaden), a comprehensive school in Wiesbaden, Germany